The following is a list of episodes for the second season of Sunrise' Aikatsu Stars! anime television series, which aired on TV Tokyo between April 6, 2017 and March 29, 2018.

The opening themes are "STARDOM!" and "MUSIC OF DREAM!!!", both by Sena, Rie, Kana and Miki - while the ending themes are "Bon Bon Voyage" by Miho from AIKATSU✩STARS and Risa, as well as "Pirouette of the Forest Light" by Sena and Ruka from AIKATSU✩STARS.

Episode list

References

Aikatsu!
Aikatsu! episode lists
2017 Japanese television seasons